Bowling took place for the men's and women's individual, doubles, trios, and team events at the 1994 Asian Games in Hiroden Bowl, Hiroshima, Japan from October 5 to October 11.

Medalists

Men

Women

Medal table

References
Results

External links
www.abf-online.org

 
1994 Asian Games events
1994
Asian Games
1994 Asian Games